The Ghelința is a left tributary of the river Râul Negru in Romania. It discharges into the Râul Negru in Imeni.

References

Rivers of Romania
Rivers of Covasna County